Rivesaltes (which means the high shores) is a commune in the Pyrénées-Orientales department in southern France.

Geography 
Rivesaltes is in the canton of La Vallée de l'Agly and in the arrondissement of Perpignan.

Politics and administration

Mayors

Twin towns 
Rivesaltes is twinned with:
 - Calgary, Canada
 - Chennai, India
 - Rangoon, Myanmar
 - Yaren, Nauru
 - Ramallah, Palestine
 - Port of Spain, Trinidad and Tobago
 - Chipping Norton, United Kingdom
 - Clitheroe, United Kingdom
 - Whalley, United Kingdom
 - Wilpshire, United Kingdom

Population

Economy 
Wine
Fortified wine is produced around Rivesaltes, as Rivesaltes AOC.

Sites of interest 
 The Camp de Rivesaltes is situated on the outskirts of the city. The Rivesaltes memorial museum is now fully open and commemorates the history of this major French concentration camp from 1939 to 2007.

Notable people 
 Joseph Joffre (1852–1931), general, born in Rivesaltes, who became prominent in the battles of World War I
 Michel Parès (1887-1966), politician, born in Rivesaltes

See also
 Perpignan–Rivesaltes Airport
 Communes of the Pyrénées-Orientales department

References

Communes of Pyrénées-Orientales